Hudson Talbott (born July 11, 1949) is an American author and illustrator known for his children's books. He has written and illustrated over 27 books, including A Walk In The Words, From Wolf to Woof!, It’s All About ME-ow, and River of Dreams - The Story of the Hudson River, which was made into a musical by composer Frank Cuthbert. Talbott collaborated with Stephen Sondheim on a book version of the composer's musical Into The Woods. He illustrated the Newbury Honor winner Show Way (written by Jacqueline Woodson), and the ALA Notable and VOYA Honor book Leonardo’s Horse (written by Jean Fritz). His most famous work, We’re Back! A Dinosaur’s Story was adapted into an animated film of the same name by Steven Spielberg. He lives in the Hudson Valley of New York and continues to write and illustrate books for young readers.

External links

 Official website

20th-century American writers
21st-century American writers
American children's writers
American cartoonists
1949 births
Living people
People from Louisville, Kentucky